Podůlší is a municipality and village in Jičín District in the Hradec Králové Region of the Czech Republic. It has about 300 inhabitants.

Notable people
Josef Knap (1900–1973), writer and poet
Josef Vinklář (1930–2007), actor

References

Villages in Jičín District